MacDonough is an Irish surname, it may refer to:

Surname:
Elizabeth MacDonough, the current Parliamentarian of the United States Senate
George MacDonough or George Macdonogh GBE KCB KCMG (1865–1942), British Army general officer
Glen MacDonough (1870–1924), US American writer, lyricist and librettist
Harry Macdonough (1871–1931), Canadian singer and recording executive
James MacDonough (born 1970) American professional bass guitarist
Thomas Macdonough (1783–1825), early-19th-century American naval officer noted for his roles in the first Barbary War and the War of 1812

Given name:
Macdonough Craven, (1858–1919), American naval officer, engineer, and politician
Tunis Augustus Macdonough Craven (1813–1864), officer in the United States Navy

Places:
MacDonough, Delaware, a small unincorporated community in New Castle County, Delaware, United States
MacDonough Island, a large island in the Possession Sound portion of Puget Sound, located in Island County, Washington
Commodore Thomas MacDonough Highway, State Route 314 (New York–Vermont) (NY 314) and Vermont Route 314 (VT 314)
Comdr. Thomas MacDonough House, a historic home located near Odessa, New Castle County, Delaware

Ships:
USS Macdonough (DD-331), Clemson-class destroyer built for the United States Navy during World War I
USS Macdonough (DD-351), Farragut-class destroyer in the United States Navy during World War II
USS Macdonough (DD-9), Lawrence-class destroyer, which was a sub-class of Bainbridge-class destroyer, in the United States Navy
USS Macdonough (DDG-39), Farragut class guided missile destroyer in the United States Navy

See also
McDonough